Ue or UE may refer to:

Businesses and organizations

Universities
 University of Edinburgh, a university in Scotland
 University of Exeter, a university in England
 University of the East, a university in the Philippines
 University of Evansville, a university in Indiana, United States
 University of Education, a public sector university of Pakistan in the field of Education and Sciences
 University Entrance, an examination or standard of achievement taken by senior New Zealand high school students

Other businesses and organizations
 European Union, in the following E.U. official languages: French, Italian, Maltese, Polish, Portuguese, Romanian, Spanish
 Transeuropean Airlines (IATA airline designator UE)
 Ultimate Ears, a custom in-ear monitor (IEM) and earphone manufacturer based in Irvine, California
 Union Electric Company, a defunct utility 
 United Electrical, Radio and Machine Workers of America, a trade union
 United Envirotech, a company based in Singapore
 Universal Edition, a music publisher

Language
 Ue (digraph), a digraph used in some writing systems
 Ue (Cyrillic), a letter in many Asian languages

Science, technology, and mathematics

Computing and telecommunications
 UltraEdit, a software text editor for Microsoft Windows
 Unreal Engine, a 3D game engine developed by Epic Games
 User equipment, a standardized term used in 3G telecommunications systems

Other uses in science, technology, and mathematics
 Unbiased estimator, in statistics
 Upper extremity, an arm
 User experience
 Usability Engineering, an activity in Human Factors Engineering

Other uses
 Ue people, a tribe from the Centre Province, Cameroon
 United Empire Loyalists, post-nominal letters for a Canadian hereditary title
 "Universe Estimate", a Nielsen Media Research term
 Urban exploration
 Unemployment
 German Type UE submarine (disambiguation)
 Use of English, a popular subject in the Hong Kong Advanced Level Examination
United Express (airline)
Underestimated
Ü#U-umlaut